The Syriac Catholic Church is an Eastern Catholic Christian jurisdiction originating in the Levant that uses the West Syriac Rite liturgy and has many practices and rites in common with the Syriac Orthodox Church. Being one of the twenty-three Eastern Catholic Churches, the Syriac Catholic Church is a self-governed sui iuris particular church, while it is in full communion with the Holy See and with the entirety of the Catholic Church.

The Syriac Catholic Church traces its history to the first centuries of Christianity. After the Chalcedonian Schism the Church of Antioch became part of Oriental Orthodoxy, and was known as the Syriac Orthodox Church, while a new Antiochian patriarchate was established to fill its place by the churches which accepted the Council of Chalcedon. The Syriac Orthodox Church came into full communion with the Holy See and the modern Syriac Orthodox Church is a result of those that did not want to join the Catholic Church. Therefore, the Syriac Catholic Church is a continuation of the original Church of Antioch.

The church is headed by Mor Ignatius Joseph III Younan, who has been the patriarch since 2009. Its patriarch of Antioch has the title of Patriarch of Antioch and all the East of the Syriacs and resides in Beirut, Lebanon.

Jesuit and Capuchin missionaries began to work among the Syriac Orthodox in Aleppo in 1626. So many of them were received into communion with Rome that, in 1662, when the patriarchate had fallen vacant, the Catholic party was able to elect one of its own, Andrew Akijan, as patriarch of the Syriac Church. This provoked a split in the community, and after Akijan's death in 1677, two opposing patriarchs were elected, one being the uncle of the other, representing the two parties (one pro-Catholic, the other anti-Catholic). When the Catholic patriarch died in 1702, this very brief line of Catholic patriarchs in the Syriac Church's patriarchal see died with him.

Later, in 1782, the Syriac Orthodox Holy Synod elected Metropolitan Michael Jarweh of Aleppo as patriarch. Shortly after he was enthroned, he declared himself Catholic and in unity with the Pope of Rome. Since Jarweh, there has been an unbroken succession of Syriac Catholic Patriarchs.

Name
The Syriac Catholic Church is sometimes also called the Syrian Catholic Church. Furthermore, it is sometimes referred by its patriarchate, the Syriac Catholic Patriarchate of Antioch. See also: Syriac Catholic Patriarchs of Antioch.

History

Pre-Crusades period
The Syriac Catholic Church claims its origin through Saint Peter prior to his departure to Rome, and extends its roots back to the origins of Christianity in the Orient; in the Acts of the Apostles we are told that it is in Antioch where the followers of Jesus for the first time were called "Christians" (Acts 11:26).

In the time of the first Ecumenical Councils, the Patriarch of Antioch held the ecclesiastical authority over the Diocese of the Orient, which was to be extended from the Mediterranean Sea to the Persian Gulf. Its scholarly mission in both languages, Greek and Syriac, was to provide the world and the Universal Church with eminent saints, scholars, hermits, martyrs and pastors. Among these great people are Saint Ephrem (373), Doctor of the Church, and Saint Jacob of Sarug (521).

During the Crusades 
During the Crusades there were many examples of warm relations between Catholic and Syriac Orthodox bishops. Some of these bishops favored union with Rome, but there was no push to unify until a decree of union between the Syriac Orthodox and Rome was signed at the Council of Florence September 30, 1444 - but the effects of this decree were rapidly annulled by opponents of it in the Syriac Church's hierarchy.

Split with the Syriac Orthodox Church
Jesuit and Capuchin missionaries evangelizing in Aleppo caused some local Syriac Orthodox faithful to form a pro-catholic movement within the Syriac Orthodox Church. In 1667, Andrew Akijan, a supporter of union with the Catholic Church, was elected as Patriarch of the Syriac Orthodox Church. This provoked a split in the community, and after Akijan's death in 1677, two opposing patriarchs were elected, with the Pro-Catholic one being the uncle of Andrew Akijan. However, when the Catholic Patriarch died in 1702, the Ottoman government supported the Syriac Orthodoxy's agitation against the Syriac Catholics, and throughout the 18th century the Syriac Catholics underwent suffering and much persecution. Due to this, there were long periods when no Syriac Catholic bishops were functioning, so a Patriarch could not be elected, and the community was forced to go entirely underground. However, in 1782, the Syriac Orthodox Holy Synod elected Metropolitan Michael Jarweh of Aleppo as Patriarch. Shortly after he was enthroned, he declared himself Catholic and in unity with the Pope of Rome. After this declaration, Jarweh took refuge in Lebanon and built the still-extant monastery of Our Lady at Sharfeh, and by that act became the Patriarch of the Syriac Catholic Church. Since Jarweh, there has been an unbroken succession of Syriac Catholic Patriarchs, which is known as the Ignatius Line.

After the split up until modern times
In 1829 the Ottoman government granted legal recognition to the Armenian Catholic Church, and in 1845 the Syriac Catholic Church was also granted its own civil emancipation. Meanwhile, the residence of the Patriarch was shifted to Aleppo in 1831. However, after the Massacre of Aleppo in 1850, the Patriarchal See was shifted to Mardin in 1854.

After becoming officially recognized by the Ottoman Government in 1845 the Syriac Catholic Church expanded rapidly. However, The expansion was ended by the persecutions and massacres that took place during the Assyrian genocide of World War I. After that, the Syriac Catholic Patriarchal See was moved to Beirut away from Mardin, to which many Ottoman Christians had fled the Genocide. In addition to its see in Beirut, the patriarchal seminary and printing house are located at Sharfeh Monastery in Sharfeh, Lebanon.

Organization

Leadership

, the Patriarch of Antioch (an Ancient major see, where several Catholic and Orthodox Patriarchates nominally reside) was Moran Mor Ignatius Joseph III Younan, resident in Beirut, Lebanon. The Syriac Catholic Patriarch always takes the name "Ignatius" in addition to another name.

In modern history the leaders of the Syriac Catholic Church have been: Patriarch Michael III Jarweh, Archbishop Clemens Daoud, Patriarch Ephrem Rahmani, Vicomte de Tarrazi, Monsignor Ishac Armaleh, Ignatius Gabriel I Tappouni, Chorbishop Gabriel Khoury-Sarkis, Ignatius Antony II Hayyek, Ignatius Moses I Daoud, Ignatius Peter VIII Abdalahad, and Ignatius Joseph III Yonan.
Eminent Syriac saints, scholars, hermits, martyrs and pastors since 1100 also include Dionysius Bar Salibi (1171), Gregorius X Bar Hebraeus (1286) and more recently Bishop Mor Flavianus Michael Malke.

The Syriac Church leadership has produced a variety of scholarly writings in a variety of topics. For example, Patriarch Ephrem Rahmani was widely praised for his work in Syriac and is responsible for Pope Benedict XV recognising Saint Ephrem as a Doctor of the Catholic Church. Likewise Patriarch Ignatius Behnam II Beni is known for imploring eastern theology to defend the Primacy of Rome.

The Patriarch of Antioch and all the East of the Syriacs presides upon the Patriarchal Eparchy of Beirut and leads spiritually all the Syriac Catholic Community around the world.

The community includes two archdioceses in Iraq, four in Syria, one in Egypt and Sudan, a Patriarchal Vicariate in Israel, a Patriarchal Vicariate in Turkey and the Eparchy of Our Lady of Deliverance in the United States and Canada.

Current jurisdictions 
The Syriac Catholic Church was formally united with the Holy See of Rome in 1781.

Middle East diocesan jurisdictions
 Syriac Catholic Patriarch of Antioch 
 Syriac Catholic Patriarchal Eparchy of Beirut, Lebanon
 Metropolitan Syriac Catholic Archeparchy of Damascus, Syria (without suffragan)
 Metropolitan Syriac Catholic Archeparchy of Homs, Syria (without suffragan; titular sees of Hama and Nabk are united with it)
 Syriac Catholic Archeparchy of Aleppo, Syria
 Syriac Catholic Archeparchy of Hassaké-Nisibi, Syria
 Syriac Catholic Archeparchy of Mossul, Iraq
 Syriac Catholic Archeparchy of Baghdad, Iraq
 Syriac Catholic Archeparchy of Hadiab-Erbil, Iraq
 Syriac Catholic Eparchy of Cairo, Egypt

Old World missionary jurisdictions
 Syriac Catholic Patriarchal Exarchate of Basra, Iraq and the Gulf
 Syriac Catholic Patriarchal Exarchate of Jerusalem (Palestine and Jordan)
 Syriac Catholic Patriarchal Exarchate of Turkey
 Syriac Catholic Patriarchal Dependency of Sudan and South Sudan (formerly 'of Sudan')

Overseas diaspora
 Syriac Catholic Eparchy of Our Lady of Deliverance of Newark, New Jersey for the US, which has 11 parishes in the United States.
 Syriac Catholic Apostolic Exarchate for Canada (6 parishes)
 Syriac Catholic Apostolic Exarchate for Venezuela

Former jurisdictions

Titular sees 
 Metropolitan : Amida of the Syriacs, Apamea in Syria of the Syriacs, Edessa in Osrhoëne of the Syriacs, Tagritum of the Syriacs
 Archiepiscopal : Chalcedon of the Syriacs
 Episcopal : Anastasiopolis of the Syriacs, Arethusa of the Syriacs, Batnæ of the Syriacs, Dara Syrorum of the Syriacs, Hama of the Syriacs (united with Homs), Hierapolis in Syria of the Syriacs, Ioppe of the Syriacs, Mardin of the Syriacs, Martyropolis of the Syriacs, Nabk of the Syriacs (united with Homs), Phoba of the Syriacs, Tripolis in Libanum of the Syriacs

Other suppressed jurisdictions 
 Syriac Catholic Eparchy of Gazireh, Turkey
 Syriac Catholic Eparchy of Mardin and Amida, Turkey
 Syriac Catholic Patriarchal Exarchate of Lebanon

Current hierarchy 
Moran Mor Ignatius Joseph III Younan (Patriarch of Antioch)
Jihad Mtanos Battah (Curial Bishop of Antioch and Titular Bishop of Phaena)
Basile Georges Casmoussa (Archbishop {personal title} and Curial Bishop of Antioch)
Flavien Joseph Melki (Curial Bishop of Antioch and Titular Archbishop of Dara dei Siri)
Jules Mikhael Al-Jamil (Auxiliary Bishop of Antioch and Titular Archbishop of Tagritum)
Gregorios Elias Tabé (Archbishop of Damascus)
Théophile Georges Kassab (Archbishop of Homs; deceased)
Denys Antoine Chahda (Archbishop of Aleppo)
Jacques Behnan Hindo (Archbishop of Hassaké-Nisibi)
Youhanna Boutros Moshe (Archbishop of Mossul)
Ephrem Yousif Abba Mansoor (Archbishop of Baghdad)
Athanase Matti Shaba Matoka (Archbishop Emeritus of Baghdad)
Clément-Joseph Hannouche (Bishop of Cairo and Protosyncellus of Sudan and South Sudan)
Yousif Benham Habash (Bishop of Our Lady of Deliverance of Newark)
Timoteo Hikmat Beylouni (Apostolic Exarch of Venezuela and Titular Bishop of Sabrata)
Iwannis Louis Awad (Apostolic Exarch Emeritus of Venezuela and Titular Bishop of Zeugma in Syria; deceased)
Michael Berbari (Patriarchal Vicar of Australia and New Zealand)

 the Church was estimated to have 159,000 faithful, 10 bishoprics, 85 parishes, 106 secular priests, 12 religious-order priests, 102 men and women in religious orders, 11 permanent deacons and 31 seminarians.

Liturgy 
The West Syriac Rite is rooted in the old tradition of both the churches of Jerusalem and Antioch and has ties with the ancient Jewish Berakah.

The Syriac Catholic Church follows a similar tradition to other Eastern Catholic Churches who use the West Syriac Rite, such as the Maronites and Syro-Malankara Christians. This rite is clearly distinct from the Greek Byzantine rite of Antioch of the Melkite Catholics and their Orthodox counterparts. Syriac Catholic priests were traditionally bound to celibacy by the Syriac Catholic local Synod of Sharfeh in 1888, but there are now a number of married priests.

The Liturgy of the Syriac Catholic Church is very similar to that of the Syriac Orthodox Church.

Liturgical paraphernalia

Fans 

The Syriac Catholic Church uses fans with bells on them and engraved with seraphim during the Qurbono. Usually someone in the minor orders would shake these fans behind a Bishop to symbolise the Seraphim. They are also used during the consecration where two men would shake them over the altar during moments in the epliclesis and words of institution when the priest says "he took and broke" and "this is my body/blood".

Thurible 
The thurible of the Syriac Catholic Church consists of 9 bells, representing the 9 choirs of angels.

Liturgy of the Hours 
The Liturgy of the Hours is exactly the same as in the Syriac Orthodox. There are two versions of this the Phenqitho and the Shhimo. The former is the more complicated 7 volume version. While the latter is the simple version.

Liturgical ranking 
Likewise the ranking of clerics in the Syriac Church is extremely similar to that of the Syriac Orthodox Church. The most notable differences are:
 Not all celibate Priests take on monastic vows. In the Syriac Orthodox Church all celibate priests are monks.
 There is a solid distinction between the major orders and minor orders in the Syriac Catholic Church:
 A man is tonsured as soon as he receives his first minor order of Mzamrono (Cantor).

Major Orders
 Bishop
 Kahno (Priest)
 Mshamshono (Deacon)

Minor Orders
 Afudyaqno (Sub-deacon)
 Quroyo (Lector)
 Mzamrono (Cantor)

Languages 
The liturgical language of the Syriac Catholic Church, Syriac, is a dialect of Aramaic. The Qurbono Qadisho (literally: Holy Mass or Holy Offering/Sacrifice) of the Syriac Church uses a variety of Anaphoras, with the Anaphora of the 12 Apostles being the one mostly in use with the Liturgy of St James the Just.

Their ancient semitic language is known as Aramaic (or "Syriac" after the time of Christ since the majority of people who spoke this language belonged to the province of "Syria"). It is the language spoken by Jesus, Mary and the Apostles. Many of the ancient hymns of the church are still maintained in this native tongue although several have been translated into Arabic, English, French and other languages.

Syriac is still spoken in some few communities in eastern Syria and northern Iraq, but for most Arabic is the vernacular language.

Martyrs 
Throughout the History of the Syriac Church there have been many martyrs. A recent example is Flavianus Michael Malke during the 1915 Assyrian genocide.

Syriac Catholics in Iraq 

On 31 October 2010, 58 Iraqi Syriac Catholics were killed by Muslim extremists while attending Sunday Divine Liturgy, 78 others were wounded. The attack by Iraqi ISIS on the congregation of Our Lady of Deliverance Syriac Catholic Church was the bloodiest single attack on an Iraqi Christian church in recent history.

Two priests, Fathers Saad Abdallah Tha'ir and Waseem Tabeeh, were killed. Another, Father Qatin, was seriously wounded but recovered.

See also 

 Dioceses of the Syriac Catholic Church
List of Syriac Catholic Patriarchs of Antioch

References

Bibliography 
 Claude Sélis, Les Syriens orthodoxes et catholiques, Brepols (col. Fils d'Abraham), Bruxelles, 1988, 
 Jean-Pierre Valognes, Vie et mort des Chrétiens d'Orient, Fayard, Paris, 1994, 
 R Janin, "Le rite syrien et les Églises syriennes" in Revue des études byzantines (1919), pp. 321-341
 Afram Yakoub: The Path to Assyria - A Call For National Renewal. Tigris Press, Södertälje 2020,

Sources and external links 

 Website of the Syriac Catholic Patriarchate 
 GCatholic linking overview of jurisdictions
 Article on the Syriac Catholic Church by Ronald Roberson on the CNEWA web site 
 GCatholic.org page on the Catholic Patriarchate of Antioch
 Opus Libani site: Syriac Catholic Church in Lebanon 
 Encyclopaedia of the Orient – Syriac Catholic Church
 Catholic Churches

Syriac religious relations and the Catholic Church 
Pope Benedict XIV, Allatae Sunt (On the observance of Oriental Rites), Encyclical, 1755
Addresses of Pope Paul VI and His Holiness Mar Ignatius Jacob III, 1971
Common Declaration of Pope John Paul II and His Holiness Mar Ignatius Zakka I Iwas, 1984 
Address of John Paul II on Occasion of the Visit to the Catholicos of the Malankarese Syrian Orthodox Church, 1986

Eparchies, churches and monasteries
Mass times and information of Syriac Catholic churches
Archdioceses of Syriac Catholics, Iraq
Mar Yousif Syriac Catholic Diocese (Al Mansour, Baghdad, Iraq)
Eparchy Our Lady of Deliverance North America
St. Ephrem Syriac Catholic Church (Jacksonville, Florida)
St. Joseph Syriac Catholic Church (Toronto, Canada)
Mar Touma Syriac Catholic Church, Michigan
Syriac Catholic Archbishopric (Aleppo, Syria)
Syriac Catholic Monastery of Mar Musa, Syria
St. Jan Apostel van Syrische Katholieken, Netherlands

 
1662 establishments in the Ottoman Empire
Apostolic sees
Organizations based in Damascus